Hafik is a town and a district of Sivas Province of Turkey. The mayor is Mitat İlhan (AKP).

The district consists of one town (Hafik) and 74 villages, including Durulmuş and Yakaboyu.

References

Populated places in Sivas Province
Districts of Sivas Province
Hafik District